Jeffrey James DeWit (born December 21, 1972) is an American businessman and politician who is serving as the Chairman of the Arizona Republican Party since 2023. A member of the Republican Party, DeWit became the State Treasurer of Arizona in 2015, succeeding Doug Ducey. DeWit said in 2016 that he did not plan to seek re-election in 2018. In 2017, President Trump nominated him to be chief financial officer of NASA. His nomination as chief financial officer of NASA was confirmed by the U.S. Senate in March 2018. He resigned from NASA in February 2020 and joined Trump's 2020 campaign later that year.

Early life and education
DeWit received his degree in Business Administration and Finance from the University of Southern California, and began his career in 1992 at Smith Barney Shearson. In 1999, DeWit started a stock trading company called ECHOtrade, in which he served as CEO for over 14 years.

Political career

In politics, DeWit has served as a Precinct Committeeman, State Committeeman, and was also appointed by the Chairman of the Arizona Republican Party to serve on the party's Redistricting Committee.

In 2014, he sought the office of Treasurer for the state of Arizona, a position being vacated by Doug Ducey, who instead ran for Governor of Arizona after serving for one term. DeWit won the Republican primary in August, defeating former Tempe Mayor Hugh Hallman and former state party Chairman Randy Pullen by a large margin. DeWit was unopposed in the general election, and was therefore the presumptive Treasurer of the State of Arizona.

DeWit also served as the chair of Donald Trump's 2016 presidential campaign in Arizona. He said in 2016 that he had no plans to seek reelection at the end of his term as State Treasurer as he disliked the "favor-factory" mentality of established politicians, whose ranks he had no desire to join.

DeWit was nominated by President Trump to become Chief Financial Officer of the National Aeronautics and Space Administration on December 1, 2017. His nomination was returned unconfirmed to the President by the U.S. Senate on January 3, 2018, under Standing Rules of the United States Senate, Rule XXXI, paragraph 6. The nomination was resubmitted to the Senate on January 8, 2018. He was confirmed by voice vote on March 14, 2018. He took office on April 3, 2018. DeWit resigned on February 13, 2020.

On June 30, 2020, it was reported that DeWit was named the chief operating officer of the Donald Trump 2020 presidential campaign.

Personal life
DeWit resides in Peoria, Arizona with his wife, Marina and his three daughters. As a part of his election campaign, his family appeared in a music video parody of Frozen.

Electoral history

References

External links

Official NASA biography
Official campaign website

|-

1972 births
21st-century American businesspeople
21st-century American politicians
American chief executives of fashion industry companies
American chief financial officers
American chief operating officers
Arizona Republican Party chairs
Businesspeople from Arizona
Living people
Marshall School of Business alumni
NASA people
People from Peoria, Arizona
State treasurers of Arizona
Trump administration personnel